Muhria is a lichen genus in the family Cladoniaceae. It is monotypic, containing the single species Muhria urceolata. The genus was circumscribed by Norwegian lichenologist Per Magnus Jørgensen in 1987. The genus name of Muhria is in honour of Lars-Erik Muhr (b.1936), a Swedish teacher and botanist (Lichenology and Mycology).

Filip Högnabba has proposed that the species should be placed in genus Stereocaulon.

References

Cladoniaceae
Lichen genera
Monotypic Lecanorales genera
Taxa described in 1987
Taxa named by Per Magnus Jørgensen